Maru is one of the main agricultural villages in Irbid Governorate, Jordan. It is located to the north-east of the city of Irbid, about 7 km, and about 4536 people live in Maru by 2015.

History

Archaeological situation 
Was found the antiquities of Greek, Roman and Islamic, which is believe to Maru based on the rubble old Roman town, the most famous landmarks the old mosque which built of black basalt stones. Had found traces back to the civilizations and Aladomip Gsasnp and Arab groups, and found the Aydaathar Roman and Islamic. In Sdralasalam able leader of the Islamic Shurahbil ibn Hasana of the annexation of the villages Horan year 13 AH 634 AD and the Battle of Yarmouk took place in that period where he was able Khalid ibn al-Walid in the battle to overcome the Romans in 636 AD 15 AH, ending Roman presence there. In the reign of the Mamelukes and the Ottomans were under the jurisdiction of the Levant / Brigade Ajloun / Cypress area, and currently tracking to the banner rod Irbid.

History
In 1596 it appeared in the Ottoman tax registers named as Marw, situated in the nahiya (subdistrict) of  Bani Kinana, part of the Sanjak of Hawran. It had 28 households and 15 bachelors; all Muslims. The villagers paid a fixed tax-rate of 25% on agricultural products; including wheat, barley, summer crops,  goats and bee-hives, in addition to occasional revenues. The total tax was 11,250 akçe; of which the majority (7,050 akçe) came from wheat. 3/24 of the revenue went to a waqf.

In 1961 the population of Maru was 449 inhabitants.

Heritage situation 
Shrine of Sheikh Issa Omari: 
he is righteous, where the Ottoman ruler in Daraa gave him lands in the villages of Maru and Habras equivalent to that treatment. The Maqam (shrine) is a building in center of the village cemetery, there inside the tomb of Sheikh and his family, consists of the old building of stone and modern cement, where it was restored and a green dome above the place. 
Popular houses:
There are in the village popular houses of stone and mud and Roman wells, as examples in the table :

Political life 
Village residents enjoy a sense of national well than most of them participate in political activities and some of them belong to different Czb. Parliamentary elections: including a former deputy in the parliament dear kamel el omari.

 Politics and elections:

There are tribal alliances, such as cluster cooperation (including the families gathered: omari and Abu Qamar and Al Karaki ), before joining the village to the Greater Irbid Municipality, there were the village council, the mayoral succession since 1997 Aaltasis Mildi of:

Muhammad Saad al-Nu'man

Mohamed Ahmed Abu Qamar

Faisal Nazzal al Karaki

Gazi Abdullah bawaanh

Events of the Fedayeen 
After the fall of the West Bank the Palestinian factions formed battalions the guerrillas bases in Jordan areas as Al-Azraq, Dibeen, Bait-yava village, Rafid village and Maru village.
The base of Maru led by Abdullah Azzam. the people of the village says: fighters gathered in hill west of the village called Qammrah.

Elections 
Residents enjoy a sense of national well than most of them participate in political activities and some of them belong to different parties. 
Parliament
Including a former deputy in the parliament kamel omari.
Municipality
There are tribal alliances, such as Taawon cluster (Omari, AbuQamar and Karaki families), before joining the village to the Greater Irbid Municipality, there were the village council some of head of it: Muhammad Saad Nu'man, Mohamed Abu Qamar, Faisal Karaki, Jazi Bawaanh (independent) and Mohamed Saleh Omari (Endorsement).

Geography 
One of the capital department (Al-Qasabeh) villages. Area 8.904 dunums, With a population of 3064 people, a population density 0.002, and about 7 km from the city of Irbid, Maru characterized by the nature of the rustic, and spacious plains, the village was the days of the Ottoman Empire is relatively small, but its heavy agricultural production, such as wheat, barley and lentils, also refers books Tabu Ottoman. Is part of the Hawran plateau, which covers northern Jordan. Bounded on the west by villages of Beit Ras and Harima, and south by Hakama, east by Mougaer and a spring of water – Rahob, and north by village of Alal
Maru agricultural research station:
Created in 1980s. In order to improve the agricultural situation in the governorate of Irbid, was contributed since it was founded on breeding crops and improved and follow-up, and guidance and provide advice and guidance to farmers, by Lookup Agriculture (Cover the cost of the seed and the harvest at the expense of the station obtained the farmer only once).
Currently, became responsible for the wealth of the bees in the region, and worked at improving yields of crops such as wheat which produces dunum minimum amounted to 400 kg of wheat.

Marw
Word Marw mean white stones, and as part of the Sahel Horan, the nature Alajafravep of the village of Marw is characterized by plains flat with a Mediterranean climate suitable for cultivation and field cultivation of grain, however, the old town was built on the hill in the center town, where they concentrated most of the population was informed of this plateau, plains and agricultural all Even those almost look like an island amid a sea of trees. Location and is bordered to the west village and the village of Beit Ras Harima and from the south and east village provision changer village and village tree either from the north village Vthdha Aal, either amount to an area of 9000 dunums

Families in the village 

Maru, like other villages on the Jordan, maintain the Jordanian people's authentic traditions transmitted from generation to generation, The social life of the wedding (marriage, holidays, deaths ..) with a combination of the population of the various tribes of Jordan authentic, which is :
Numan:
Belong to the Caliph Umar Bin Al Khattab. Introduced their grandfather (Issa al-Numan) to Maru, around the year 1800.
Relatives of families: Omari / villages in the north of Jordan and Palestine.
Prominent figure: Ahmed, Abdullah and Abogeroan al-Numan, they grandparents Numan tribe,
Nuri and Mansour al-Nu'man, Badr Al-Nawaf - Chairman villager
Abu Qamar:
Belong to Prince Zahir al-Umar, which ruled the north of Jordan, Galilee and Horan in 1765.
Grandfather of Al-qmoor (AbdulQader Ahmed Abu Qmar) was submitted to the Maru in 1917 from villages of Sama and Umm Qais.
Relatives families: El-Siahin /Umm Qais, Zeidnah /Jarash, and A-Tall / Irbid.
Prominent person: Mahmoud and Abdullah Abuqamar grain traders in Horan area,
A famous lawyer Khaled Abuqamar, Talal Pasha Abuqamar - Assistant Commander of the Jordanian Air Force.
karaki:
Belong to Ibrahim bin Khalil Aldmowor, Introduced their grandfather (Osman Karaki) to Maru, around the year 1917 
.Relatives of families : villages Filahhat and Aldmowor / Mkhrbah and Horan .
Prominent figure: Ahmed Othman farmer and dealer, Dr. Ghazi Al-Karaki
Alzkot: 
Belong to the Caliph Omar Bin Al Khattab, Introduced their grandfather (Mohamed Abdel Kader Alzkt) to Maru, about 1926 from the village of Samar. Relatives of families : Omari / Bni kenanah 
Prominent figure: Mohammed Amin - Dean in the Jordanian Air Force, Dr. Hakam Waleed Alomari - Professor in USA Miami University.
Bwaanh:
Belong to the village of Baon / Ajloun. grandfather came to Maru in 1918 from the village of Al'al
Relatives : Ajloun and cousins in Aal
Prominent figure: Abdullah al-Attiyah- Head of Albwaanh, Jazzy Bwaanh - member municipalities.

• Others families 
Maru also contains a group of families, which is from the social fabric, such as:
Abu Abbas; grandfather Ali eloklah.
Almsadi; grandfather Ahmad Massad introduced about 1937 from the village of Deryousef, Abdul Rahman Elmsadi the first doctor in Maru.
Wabran; al-zoubi.
Kiwan; grandfather Rasheed Abu Ali.
Abu nuseer; grandfather mahmod nusaier makahleh.

References

Bibliography

External links
http://www.visitjordan.com
Greater Irbid Municipality
Irbid Guide

Populated places in Irbid Governorate